Tuluganovka is a rural locality (a selo) and the administrative center of Akhmatovsky Selsoviet, Narimanovsky District, Astrakhan Oblast, Russia. The population was 425 as of 2010. There are 28 streets.

Geography 
Tuluganovka is located 64 km southeast of Narimanov (the district's administrative centre) by road. Rychansky is the nearest rural locality.

References 

Rural localities in Narimanovsky District